Veeraswamy Ravichandran (born 30 May 1961) is an Indian actor, director, producer, music director, lyricist and editor in the Kannada Film Industry. He is the son of film producer N. Veeraswamy. As producer, Ravichandran continues to run his father's production house, Sri Eswari Productions. He is popularly known as "Crazy Star", a title fans have prefixed to his name.

Personal life 
Ravichandran was born in Tirunelveli, Madras State (now Tamil Nadu), India to N. Veeraswamy and Pattammal. His father is N. Veeraswamy was a producer of South Indian film industry. Ravichandran married Sumathi, on the Valentine's Day; 14 February 1986. The couple has a daughter Geethanjali, two sons Manoranjan and Vikram. Manoranjan made his acting debut with Saheba (2017). Ravichandran famous for bringing innovations to Kannada film industry through Premaloka (1987) and introducing Juhi Chawla.

Film career 
He made his first on screen appearance as child actor in Dhoomakethu and Kula Gourava - both starring Dr.Rajkumar, the latter also being his father's first movie as independent producer. He made his debut as a producer with Prema Matsara (1982). He began his acting career with an antagonist role in Khadeema Kallaru (1982) which was produced by him. His second film was Chakravyuha (1983) which was also co-produced by him. He then appeared in few more successful films before casting himself in Premaloka (1987) which turned out to be a blockbuster. He is often considered as "The Show Man" of Kannada cinema for his multi-faceted works in his associated films.

Ravichandran initially acted in and directed movies produced by his own banner, Eswari Productions. After Premaloka, he accepted acting offers from other producers. He has worked with leading directors of the Kannada film industry such as Rajendra Singh Babu and D. Rajendra Babu. His association with D. Rajendra Babu is very successful, resulting in several hits, including Naanu Nanna Hendthi (1985), Ramachaari (1991), Sriramachandra (1992), Annayya (1993) and Yaare Neenu Cheluve (1998).

Shanti Kranti (1991) was the most expensive film ever made in Kannada industry at that time. The film was a multilingual project with Rajinikanth and Nagarjuna in prominent roles in Tamil and Telugu respectively. Ramachaari (1991), Halli Meshtru (1992), Putnanja (1995) were notable blockbusters in 90s. Ravichandran and Hamsalekha collaborated on dozens of movies. The end of their long-standing partnership proved to be unsuccessful for both of them. In 2002, Ravichandran embarked on an ambitious film called Ekangi. Shot inside a massive glass mansion built at a cost of Rs 80 lakh, it was a unique take on loneliness. The success of Malla (2004) began a new chapter in his career.

He started his company Eswari Audio later to be known as Eswari Entertainments. He was also awarded as the Best Musical Director on the state level. He not only brought the trend of Big-Budget Movies to Kannada cinema but also brought in Digital Grading technology. He started selling music cassettes through cable operators to beat piracy. Ravichandran was also seen on television as a judge in Dancing-star season-2 on Colors Kannada.

His most recent successes were Maanikya (2014), Drishya (2014) and Hebbuli (2017).

In 2019, Ravichandran played the role of Krishna in Kurukshetra. This was the first mythological film in his career.

Filmography

As Actor

As Director and Writer

Awards
Cinema Express Awards

 Cinema Express Award For Best Debut Director - Premaloka - 1987
 Cinema Express Award For Best Actor - Premaloka - 1987
 Cinema Express Award For Best Director - Ranadheera - 1989

Karnataka State Film Awards
 Karnataka State Film Award (Special Jury Award) – Shanti Kranti
 Karnataka State Film Award for Best Actor – Ekangi (2001–02)
 Karnataka State Film Award for Best Director for Ekangi (2001–02)
 Karnataka State Film Award for Best Music Director for Ekangi (2001–02)
 Puttanna Kanagal Award for Lifetime Achievement (2005–06)

Other Awards

 Suvarna Film Awards for Lifetime Achievement
 Rajyotsava Awards (2010)
 Udaya Film Award for Best Supporting Actor – Aham Premasmi
 NTR National Award-2013
 Honorary Doctorate From CMR University - 2019  
Honorary Doctorate From Bangalore university - 2022

Notes

References

External links
 

Living people
20th-century Indian male actors
21st-century Indian male actors
Indian male film actors
Male actors in Kannada cinema
Kannada film score composers
Kannada film directors
Male actors from Bangalore
Kannada film producers
Kannada male actors
Kannada-language lyricists
Indian male songwriters
20th-century Indian composers
21st-century Indian composers
Musicians from Bangalore
Film producers from Bangalore
Male actors in Tamil cinema
Tamil film directors
Film directors from Bangalore
Recipients of the Rajyotsava Award 2010
Male film score composers
20th-century male musicians
21st-century male musicians
1961 births